Woodstock is a rural town and locality in the City of Townsville, Queensland, Australia.

Geography 

The area in the head of the catchments for the Ross River. The Ross River Dam is a major source of water for Townsville and the Majors Creek/Upper Haughton area.

There is a substation at Woodstock to boost power to the area and it feeds into the Kelso substation in the Upper Ross area of Townsville.

History
The town takes its name from the Woodstock pastoral run, which was named in 1863, by Mark Watt Reid, station manager for pastoralist John Melton Black.

Woodstock Provisional School No opened in September 1890. On 1 January it became Woodstock State School. The preschool burnt down around Christmas 2004. In 2015, Woodstock State School celebrated its 125th anniversary.

Woodstock and its large surrounding area was in Thuringowa until 1997 when a change in local government boundaries resulted in this part of Thuringowa being incorporated into City of Townsville.

Facilities 
The Woodstock General Store is the local shop, cafe, news agent, service station, bank and post office. There is also a service station situated at neighbouring Calcium.

The Woodstock branch of the Queensland Country Women's Association meets at the QCWA Hall at 42 Woodstock Avenue. The QCWA Hall is used for many other functions like stalls and markets to bingo and parties.

Education 
Woodstock State School is a government primary (Prep-6) school for boys and girls at Woodstock Avenue. In 2017, the school had an enrolment of 60 students with 7 teachers (4 full-time equivalent) and 5 non-teaching staff (3 full-time equivalent).

Sport
Woodstock is home to many types of sports, from the Woodstock Horse Sports, Motocross and off road track, to a rifle club, and dog show events held at a dedicated site next to the sports and recreation club.

The Woodstock Sport and Recreational Club is used on Friday nights as a bar. The Woodstock Motocross track holds events most weekends and is well-known in Queensland. There is also sky diving or flight-seeing tours.

The area has been nominated as a site for a future motorsports precinct.

Transport
Woodstock's main center is located on the Flinders Highway where the Woodstock-Giru Road and the old Flinders Highway meet the current Flinders Highway.

Local school buses run from Reid River to Woodstock and from Toonpan to Woodstock during schools days taking the local children to the Woodstock School and another local bus runs from Reid River to William Ross High School (Townsville) for the High school Children.

Woodstock has its own airport, listed as Woodstock Airport it is better known as Donnington Airpark.  The area supports a number of private airstrips.

The Western rail line bisects the area (the line between Townsville and Mount Isa).  The area is also dissected by gas and water pipelines.

Mining
Calcium is the name of a suburb in the Woodstock area and is the main industry site of the area, they mine limestone.

References

External links 

 Town map of Woodstock, 1976

Suburbs of Townsville
Localities in Queensland